This page lists works with different titles in the United Kingdom and United States. Categories of such works include co-editions of books and foreign releases of films. Unless otherwise noted, UK titles are also used in most other countries, with the exception of Canada. Not listed are minor changes due to American and British English spelling differences; for example, the American film Rumor Has It... is titled Rumour Has It... in the UK, and, atypically, in Canada as well.

Legend:
An asterisk (*) indicates which of the two countries the work originated in. If a work originated in a third country, this is covered in the Notes column. 
[c] indicates cases where Canada follows UK usage.
 [a] indicates cases where Australia follows US usage.

Film and television

Games

Literature

Music

Other

References

Works With Different Titles In The United Kingdom And United States, List Of
Arts-related lists